Ramzan Sugar Mills is a Pakistani sugar mill company. It was established by Pakistani businessman Mian Muhammad Sharif in 1992. It is part of the Sharif Group of Companies.

In February 2011, CarboUA tested the plant of Ramzan Sugar Mills and conducted the successful result in March 2011.

Power project 
In September 2012, National Electric Power Regulatory Authority (NEPRA) signed on an Co-Generation Power Project agreement with the mill to produce the power with the capacity of 100 megawatt under the name of Ramzan Energy Ltd. The power will be generated by industrial waste bagasse of sugar-canes.

Critical responses 
After 2014 floods hit Jhang District, politician Imran Khan criticized the mill and a bridge (under-construction in Bhawana) while addressing in Jhang that Sharif group were only constructing the bridge to save their mill not the people. Where farmers had complained that the mill only pays them 70 percent of the offered price for sugar-cane, and that even after one year.

See also 
 List of mills in Pakistan
 List of companies of Pakistan

References

External links 
 

Sugar companies of Pakistan
Pakistani companies established in 1992
Agriculture companies established in 1992
Economy of Punjab, Pakistan